Dierstein Abbey was a Benedictine monastery, on the site now occupied by Schloss Oranienstein near Diez, Germany.

It is first recorded in 1153 and was probably founded by the counts of Diez. A second church is recorded in 1221, dedicated to John the Baptist. It had extensive endowments in its heyday, but in 1564 it was abolished. It was recorded in 1643 that it had fallen into ruin. During the construction of the Schloss Oranienstein's main wing, stones were re-used from the monastery ruins. During the 1704-09 rebuild of the Scloss, the last visible ruins of the monastery disappeared.

Bibliography
Jacob Marx: Geschichte des Erzstiftes Trier. Linz 1862, S. 171 ff. 

Benedictine monasteries in Germany
Former Christian monasteries in Germany
Monasteries in Rhineland-Palatinate